is a Quasi-National Park that spans the borders of Tokushima and Kōchi Prefectures, Japan. Within Tokushima Prefecture, the park includes a stretch of the Yoshino River and the Iya Valley.

Past archaeological digs in Mt. Tsurugi revealed stone artifacts, paving stones, brick arches, complex series of tunnels, marble corridors and human mummies. The origin of these artifacts are unknown.

See also

 List of national parks of Japan

References

National parks of Japan
Parks and gardens in Kōchi Prefecture
Parks and gardens in Tokushima Prefecture
Protected areas established in 1964